Julia Sutton (born 7 December 1938) is an English actress and singer.

She appeared in the film Half a Sixpence, the second series of Albert and Victoria, Upstairs, Downstairs, Dixon of Dock Green, and Father Brown.

Sutton has appeared on stage as Nancy in Oliver!, Mme. Dindon in La Cage aux Folles, Hortense in Martin Guerre (1995), as The Bird Woman in Mary Poppins (2004–05) and as Sister Mary Lazarus in Sister Act the Musical at the London Palladium.

She appeared in a number of other BBC productions, including the TV musical Pickwick for the in 1969, and in the dystopian drama 1990 as a Non-Citizen in a 1977 episode of the same name. Sutton made many appearances on BBC TV's The Good Old Days.  She carries on her acting work in adverts, pantomimes and West End production

She married dancer Don Vernon and they had four children: Kate-Alice Woodbridge (also a west end performer), Harvey, Nicholas and Stuart Woodbridge.

References

External links

Living people
Place of birth missing (living people)
English film actresses
English television actresses
English stage actresses
English women singers
1938 births